Chester Bliss may refer to:

Chester Bowles, full name Chester Bliss Bowles (1901–1986), American diplomat and politician from Connecticut
Chester Ittner Bliss (1899–1979), American biologist and statistician